The musée Nicolas Poussin is a museum in Andelys in France. It is housed in an 18th-century house and named after the painter Nicolas Poussin, born in the hamlet of Villers, near Andelys, in 1594. Its collections include 18th-century furniture, religious objects, window glass, a 3rd-century Gallo-Roman mosaic, 19th- and 20th-century paintings and a painting of Coriolanus by Poussin himself.

Sources
Official Musée Nicolas Poussin website—

Poussin, Musee Nicolas
Poussin, Musee Nicolas
Poussin, Musee Nicolas
Poussin, Musee Nicolas